The 2078th Air Weather Reconnaissance Squadron is a discontinued United States Air Force unit.  It was assigned to the 308th Reconnaissance Group, Weather and was discontinued at Tinker Air Force Base, Oklahoma on 20 March 1950.

History
The squadron was established as a weather reconnaissance training unit at Fairfield-Suisun Air Force Base, California, with a mission of training replacement personnel for weather reconnaissance and for conducting special research studies for development of equipment and reconnaissance techniques. It operated Boeing WB-29 Superfortress weather aircraft.

The squadron moved to Tinker Air Force Base, Oklahoma on 1 October 1948.  It was discontinued on 30 March 1950.  Its personnel and equipment were transferred to the 513th Reconnaissance Squadron.  Almost immediately, the 513th was alerted for a special project at Dhahran Airfield, Saudi Arabia.  Flight B of the squadron deployed to Arabia, leaving its other flights at Tinker.

Lineage
 Designated as the 1st Weather Reconnaissance Squadron (Special) and organized 1 June 1948
 Redesignated 2078th Air Weather Reconnaissance Squadron on 1 October 1948
 Discontinued on 20 March 1950

Assignments
 308th Reconnaissance Group, 1 June 1948 – 20 March 1950

Stations
 Fairfield-Suisun Air Force Base, California, 1 June 1948
 Tinker Air Force Base, Oklahoma, 1 October 1949 – 20 March 1950

Aircraft
 WB-29 Superfortress, 1948-1950

See also

References

Weather squadrons of the United States Air Force
MAJCOM squadrons of the United States Air Force
Reconnaissance squadrons of the United States Air Force